Augusta Keith Dabney (October 23, 1918 – February 4, 2008) was an American actress known for her roles on many soap operas, such as the wealthy but kindly matriarch Isabelle Alden on the daytime series Loving. She played the role from 1983 to 1987, from 1988 to 1991, and again from 1994 to 1995.

Early years 
Dabney was born on October 23, 1918, the daughter of Thomas G. Dabney and Jessie Dabney. She was born and raised in Berkeley, California, and  graduated from the University of California at Berkeley, where she was a member of Kappa Kappa Gamma sorority and two honor societies. In 1937, she moved to New York so that she could study at the American Academy of Dramatic Arts.

Career
Dabney acted in stock theater and on Broadway. Her Broadway debut was in Abe Lincoln in Illinois (1938), and her final Broadway appearance was in Sacrilege (1995).

In the early days of live television, Dabney appeared in numerous episodes of such anthology drama series as Studio One, Kraft Television Theatre, and Robert Montgomery Presents. On November 21, 1950, she co-starred in "The Perfect Type" on Armstrong Circle Theatre.

She also had roles on numerous other daytime soaps, including Young Dr. Malone as leading character Tracey Malone, Another World as Laura Baxter (1964–1965), As the World Turns in two different roles, Love is a Many-Splendored Thing, Guiding Light as the original Barbara Norris (1970), A World Apart as leading character Betty Kahlman Barry (1970–1971), General Hospital as Lee Baldwin's second wife, Caroline Chandler (1975–1976), One Life to Live as Pat Kendall's mother, Helena Ashley (1979) and The Doctors as Theodora Van Allen (1980–1981).

Dabney's film debut came in That Night (1957), and her final film appearance was in The Paper (1994).

Personal life
On September 12, 1941, in New York City, Dabney married actor Kevin McCarthy, with whom she had three children. They were married in 1941 and divorced in 1964. She was sister-in-law to writer Mary McCarthy during this marriage. Her second husband was actor William Prince. They were married from 1964 until his death in 1996. Dabney and Prince appeared together on at least four soaps: Young Dr. Malone (before their marriage), Another World, As the World Turns, and A World Apart. They also appeared together in one film, The Paper (1994), where they portrayed a married couple (the parents of the lead character, Henry Hackett, played by Michael Keaton). Her last performance was on an episode of 100 Centre Street (2001).

In 1957, Dabney was nominated for a BAFTA Award for Best Actress in a Leading Role for her starring performance in a film drama, That Night!

Death
Dabney died after an extended illness on February 4, 2008, aged 89, in her Dobbs Ferry, New York.

Filmography

References

External links

Obituary, variety.com; accessed August 3, 2015.

1918 births
2008 deaths
American film actresses
American soap opera actresses
American television actresses
Actresses from Berkeley, California
University of California, Berkeley alumni
20th-century American actresses
21st-century American women